Kenneth Lynch, OBE (18 March 1938 – 18 December 2019) was an English singer, songwriter, entertainer, and actor. He appeared in many variety shows in the 1960s. At the time, he was among the few black singers in British pop music. He was appointed an OBE in the 1970 New Year Honours list.

Early life
Lynch grew up in Stepney, East London, as one of 13 children; his sister Gladys (stage name Maxine Daniels) was a jazz singer of some note. His father was born in Barbados and his mother was mixed-raced British and Jamaican.  After leaving school at 15 and working various jobs, he did national service in the Royal Army Service Corps and was the regimental featherweight boxing champion.

Career
Before Lynch had several UK hit singles in the early 1960s, he released "Twist Me Pretty Baby" with Bert Weedon in 1962 (HMV-45 POP 989); the label's credit reads "Shouts by Kenny Lynch". Two top ten hits were "Up on the Roof", in January 1963; and "You Can Never Stop Me Loving You", in August, 1963. He is also known for a single release of "Misery", the first cover version of a Beatles song to be released. In early 1963, Lynch had been on the same bill as the Beatles on the group's first British tour; John Lennon and Paul McCartney wrote "Misery" in January 1963, in the hopes that the artist on top of the bill, Helen Shapiro, would record it. Shapiro's record producer turned it down, but Lynch took the composition and gave it a much more pop-oriented arrangement than the Beatles would use when they recorded "Misery" themselves on their debut album, Please Please Me. Whilst on a coach with the Beatles (on tour with Helen Shapiro), Lynch reportedly offered to help them write a song, but quickly became frustrated and criticised their ability to compose music – at the time Lennon and McCartney were writing "From Me to You". Years later he appeared on the album cover of Wings' 1973 album Band on the Run, along with other celebrities.

Much of Lynch's material was self-written, but he also covered songs by writers of the Brill Building.

Lynch also wrote songs for others including actress Linda Thorson, Small Faces' No. 3 UK hit "Sha-La-La-La-Lee" and Cilla Black's No. 5 UK hit "Love's Just a Broken Heart", in collaboration with American songwriter Mort Shuman. "You'd Better Believe It" (co-written with Jerry Ragavoy) and "Sorry She's Mine", which also appeared on the Small Faces' 1966 debut album, were both Lynch works.

Lynch took part in the A Song for Europe contest in 1962 with the song "There's Never Been A Girl", but failed to win through to represent the UK in the Eurovision Song Contest. Lynch had more success in 1978, as a songwriter and producer. That year, his song "Don't Bother to Knock", written for the group Midnight, placed second in the contest. The same year he wrote '"Love Crazy", the theme used for Carry On Emmannuelle, and "You Can't Fight It", the vocal version of the theme to the John Carpenter film Assault on Precinct 13. In the mid-1960s he owned a record shop, the Kenny Lynch Record Centre in Walker's Court, Soho.

Lynch oversaw the production for Hylda Baker and Arthur Mullard's comedy version of "You're the One That I Want", which reached 22 in the UK Singles Chart in September 1978. In the early 1980s, Lynch formed a songwriting partnership with former tennis player Buster Mottram, a long-time white nationalist political activist.

Lynch appeared on television programmes including Celebrity Squares, Mooncat & Co., Room at the Bottom, Bullseye and Curry and Chips. He also appeared on Z-Cars, The Sweeney, Till Death Us Do Part and Treasure Hunt.

Lynch completed the London Marathon in 1982, played in several charity football matches and took part in Michael Parkinson's 'Celebrity Cricket' fundraisers. In 2018, Lynch had a concert tour with Jimmy Tarbuck and Anita Harris, as well as appearing in ITV's Last Laugh in Vegas.

Personal life and death
He had two daughters, Amy Lynch and Bobby Lynch.

Lynch died in the early hours of 18 December 2019, aged 81. He had been suffering from cancer.

Discography

Chart singles

Filmography

See also
Popcorn (music style)

References

External links

 
 
  as Kenny Lynch Music

1938 births
2019 deaths
English male singer-songwriters
Officers of the Order of the British Empire
People from Stepney
English male television actors
Black British male actors
English male film actors
English people of Jamaican descent
English people of Barbadian descent
English record producers
Royal Army Service Corps soldiers
EMI Records artists
20th-century British Army personnel
20th-century Black British male singers